Conscious is the second studio album recorded by New Zealand music duo Broods, released on 24 June 2016. It builds on the electropop sound established in their 2014 debut, Evergreen, with elements of industrial and R&B. The album includes collaborations with Tove Lo and Lorde, and was preceded in April 2016 by the RMNZ Gold-certified single, "Free".

Upon release, Conscious was met with generally positive reviews and debuted at  1 and 2, respectively, on the New Zealand and Australian album charts. In the US, the album charted lower than Evergreen on the Billboard 200 at 52 but reached career highs on the Rock and Alternative charts.

Background and development
In August 2014, Broods released their debut album, which was produced entirely by Joel Little. It was preceded by the single "Mother & Father". The album received positive reviews and was successful in their home country of New Zealand, charting at number 1. After the album was released the duo embarked on a tour, which also visited the United States. In April 2016, the duo opened for British singer-songwriter Ellie Goulding for select US dates on her Delirium World Tour.

On April 18, the duo announced the Conscious tour and released the album artwork and track listing.

Singles
"Free" was released 1 April 2016 as the album's lead single. It debuted at No. 30 on the New Zealand Singles Chart and has since reached a peak position of 21; it has also been certified Gold by Recorded Music NZ. The single is their highest-charting entry to date on the Australian Singles Chart at its peak of 30. "Free" impacted American modern rock (or alternative) radio on 12 April 2016 and serves as the duo's third official single in that territory.

"Heartlines", co-written by Lorde, was also released as a promotional track on 10 June 2016. It reached No. 3 on the New Zealand Heatseekers chart. Its music video was released on 29 July 2016. The song was serviced to American hot adult contemporary radio on 16 January 2017 as the album's second official single.

Other songs
The duo released "Couldn't Believe" to digital retailers on 20 May 2016 as the first promotional single to support pre-orders. It peaked at number 4 on the New Zealand Heatseeker Singles chart and also charted at No. 81 in Australia.

Commercial performance
Conscious debuted at number one on the New Zealand Top 40 Albums Chart and stayed there for four weeks, becoming their second consecutive chart-topper, after 2014's Evergreen. In Australia, the album entered the ARIA Top 100 Album Chart at a career-high position of 2, beaten out by The Getaway by the Red Hot Chili Peppers.

In the United States, Conscious sold 7,000 units in its first week and debuted at career highs of 5 and 7 on the Top Alternative Albums and Top Rock Albums charts, respectively. Conscious charted lower than its predecessor on the Billboard 200 (at No. 52) due to low streaming values but outsold Evergreen by twenty positions, reaching No. 25 on the Top Album Sales component chart.

Critical reception

Pryor Stroud for PopMatters noted "Broods have concocted a record of marked consistency, one that commands attention from its first wail to its last syllable."

Writing for Exclaim!, Tim Forster criticised the album's "failure to shake listeners awake and captivate them with memorable moments."

Track listing
Track listing taken from iTunes.

Notes
  indicates a co-producer

Personnel
Credits adapted from Tidal.

Broods
 Caleb Nott – background vocals , drum programming , keyboards , bass guitar , programming , percussion 
 Georgia Nott – vocals , background vocals , keyboards , piano , organ 

Additional musicians

 Joel Little – drum programming , programming , background vocals , keyboards , percussion 
 Captain Cuts – programming 
 Alex Hope – keyboards, programming 
 Tove Lo – vocals 
 Olivia Nott – background vocals 
 Rachel Wells – cello 
 Mahuia Bridgman-Cooper – string arrangement, violin 
 Iselta Alison – viola 
 Jessica Hindin – violin 

Technical

 Rich Costey – mixer 
 Manny Marroquin – mixer 
 Joel Little — engineer , mixer 
 Captain Cuts – engineer 
 Alex Hope – engineer 
 Jason Huss – engineer 
 Olly Harmer – engineer 
 Tove Nilsson – engineer 
 Martin Cooke – assistant mixer 
 Nicolas Fournier – assistant mixer 
 Chris Galland – assistant mixer 
 Ike Schultz – assistant mixer

Charts

Weekly charts

Year-end charts

References

2016 albums
Broods albums
Polydor Records albums
Island Records albums
Universal Music Australia albums
Albums produced by Joel Little
Albums produced by Alex Hope (songwriter)